James L. Papandrea (born May 9, 1963) is an author, Catholic theologian, historian, speaker, and singer/songwriter. He is currently Professor of Church History and Historical Theology at Garrett-Evangelical Theological Seminary in Evanston, Illinois (on the campus of Northwestern University), and formerly taught at the Archdiocese of Chicago's Institute for Diaconal Studies. 

His many books have been translated into multiple languages, and he has a significant presence on YouTube, including his video series, "The Original Church." Papandrea is also one of the world's foremost scholars of Novatian of Rome.

Academic career 

Papandrea earned an M.Div. degree from Fuller Theological Seminary (1989), and a Ph.D. from Northwestern University (1998), in the history of the early Church and the Roman Empire, with a secondary concentration in New Testament interpretation. He also received a certificate in the history and topography of the city of Rome from the American Academy in Rome (1995). In 2008, he started teaching early Church History at Garrett Evangelical Theological Seminary, and is recognized for his ecumenical work on behalf of the whole body of Christ. 

In addition to his academic roles, Papandrea is also a Senior Fellow of the St. Paul Center for Biblical Theology, as well as a member of the Society of Biblical Literature (SBL), the North American Patristics Society (NAPS), the Academy of Catholic Theologians (ACT), and was recently named a "Springtime Ambassador" by the Springtime of Faith Foundation, which is an organization facilitating ecumenical dialogue and Christian cooperation.

Musician/songwriter 

In 1984, after several years with the Milwaukee-based band, the Crabs, and the Minneapolis-based band, Safari, Papandrea formed a group called, the Neumes, which migrated from Minneapolis to Los Angeles. The Neumes released two recordings: Ars Nova and Contrast. In 1995, Papandrea formed the group, Remember Rome, which went on to release four CDs: Remember Rome, La Bocca della Veritá, Carpe Diem, and Holy Smoke – The Best of Remember Rome. He has been commissioned to write music for choirs, and has written two musicals, The Prodigal’s Dream (An Easter Opera), and Treasures of the Heart (A Christmas Musical). The song, "Miracle of Light", from Treasures of the Heart was featured in a Catholic Christmas compilation CD, and other songs of his have also been included in internationally released compilations.

Papandrea is a teacher of songwriting, having been trained in the methods of the Nashville Songwriters’ Association (NSAI), and a member of the Catholic Association of Music. Most recently, Papandrea released a solo CD entitled Still Quiet Voice, which is a collection of songs inspired by his Catholic faith. His music ministry often combines his original songs with inspirational speaking, and he also offers concerts that include prayer, Scripture readings and storytelling.

Publications 
  
  (Pamphlet)
 
 
 
  (Pamphlet)
 
 
 Papandrea, James L. (January 23, 2012). Reading the Church Fathers (second edition). Sophia Institute Press.
 
  (English Translations with Introduction)
 
 
 
 Papandrea, James L. (2017). From Star Wars to Superman: Christ and Salvation in Science Fiction and Superhero Films. Sophia Institute Press. .
 Aquilina, Mike; Papandrea, James L. (2018). How Christianity Saved Civilization... And Must Do So Again. Sophia Institute Press. .
 Papandrea, James L. (2019). A Week in the Life of Rome. IVP Academic. .
 Papandrea, James L. (2019). What Really Happens After We Die: There WILL Be Hugs in Heaven. Sophia Institute Press. .
 Papandrea, James L. (2019). The Early Church (33-313): St. Peter, the Apostles, the Martyrs (Vol. 1 of the Reclaiming Catholic History Series). Ave Maria Press. .
 Papandrea, James L. (2021). Praying A Christ-Centered Rosary: Meditations on the Mysteries. Ave Maria Press. .
 Papandrea, James L. (2021). The Squire's Journey. En Route Books and Media.

Awards 

 First place, 2020 Catholic Press Association Book Awards, Best New Religious Book Series.

See also

References

External links 
 Official homepage

1963 births
Living people
Musicians from Madison, Wisconsin
Northwestern University alumni
Fuller Theological Seminary alumni
Songwriters from Illinois
Songwriters from Wisconsin
Writers from Illinois
Writers from Madison, Wisconsin
20th-century American Roman Catholic theologians
American expatriates in Italy
21st-century American Roman Catholic theologians